<noinclude>
John Cleland was an English novelist.

John Cleland may also refer to:

 John Cleland (racing driver) (born 1952), Scottish racing driver
 John Burton Cleland (1878–1971), South Australian microbiologist and naturalist
 John Fullerton Cleland (1821–1901), missionary in China and South Australian public servant
 John Cleland (anatomist) (1835–1925), Regius Professor of Anatomy (Glasgow)
 John R.D. Cleland ( – ), US major general, of 8th Infantry Division (United States)
 John Cleland, Canadian Actor